Longmeadow High School (LHS) is an American public high school located in Longmeadow, Massachusetts. Founded in 1956, it enrolls approximately 1,000 students. The school's mascot is a Lancer.

It was ranked as the sixth best public school in Massachusetts in a 2011 report by Newsweek. 96% of graduates continue their studies at the college level.

New school building 
The original high school building was replaced by a new building. The original building was demolished with the exception of the 1971 science wing, which at the time included the swimming pool, library spaces, science classrooms, and a large open classroom known as the business technology center. Construction began in 2011 and continued until April 2013. The renovated natatorium (swimming pool) and locker rooms opened in the fall of 2012, and the new school building which was constructed southeast of the original building opened on February 25, 2013, following the school's winter vacation. The new building consists of a new core section with the auditorium at its center and surrounded by a circular lobby. Around the lobby in this portion are the cafeteria, school office, library, computer lab, and special subject classrooms.

The main two-story academic wing housing most of the school's classrooms extends out to the west from the core lobby area. North of the core lobby is the new gymnasium and athletic and physical education spaces as well as the renovated 1971 wing which was completed during the summer of 2013. The reused wing was nearly completely gutted on the inside and received a completely new brick facade to match the new 2013 building with only the swimming pool and its locker rooms remaining laid out as they were originally built.

The portion of the wing where the media center was now contains the fitness center, a new PE room containing a wooden dance floor, the health classroom, and a new business technology center. The northernmost part of the wing is separated from the school proper by security doors. It contains the offices of the school department and LCTV, the town's community access TV channel.

A parking lot and drop-off now occupies the space where the former building stood. A new athletic field is located where the former student parking lot was located.

A ceremony was held in September 2013 for the completion of the new high school building. The new school was built at an estimated cost of  $78.4 million, and was partially funded by the Massachusetts School Building Authority. The town's portion was $44 million and included required matching funds for the MSBA's portion of the project as well as the full costs for the demolition and renovation parts of the project as they were outside the scope of the MSBA's approved program.

Original school building 
The original school was constructed in 1954, with subsequent additions in 1958, 1963, 1971, 1999, and 2009. The renovations created courtyards surrounded by corridors. By the turn of the millennium, the high school supported a peak occupancy of approximately 3,000 students.

Years of mistreatment had caused serious maintenance issues over the years. In 2009, the district appropriated money to refurbish the media center, which at the time was located in the 1971 wing. In 2010, demand for a new school grew until the town voted in favor of constructing a new state-of-the-art facility. District offices were demolished the same year to make way for the proposed academic wing.

Faculty and staff moved into the new building in February 2013 and by April, the building was gone.

Athletics

Lacrosse

Longmeadow has a storied high school lacrosse tradition in both the boys' and girls' programs. Since 1970, the first year of varsity play for the boys' lacrosse program at Longmeadow, the team won Massachusetts State Championships in 1970, '74–'77, '79–'81, '83–'86, '88–90, '92, '97, '08, '13 and 2022. 

Longmeadow's boys' team has produced 36 All-American selections and six Academic All-American selections.

Football
The 2007 team finished 13–0, a school record due to the new playoff system, and beat Leominster 21–0 in the Division 1 Super Bowl at Westfield State University.

Longmeadow held a 47-game winning streak from 2005 to 2008. The streak eventually came to an end on Thanksgiving Day, November 27, 2008 to East Longmeadow, losing by a score of 16-13 and ending the 47-game winning streak. However, they went on to participate in their 13th consecutive Division I Super Bowl, and went on to win their 9th Western-Central Mass State Championship over Fitchburg.

The 2014 reached the Division 2 State Championship. But they fell to Marshfield High School, 45–6. The Lancers trailed, 39–0, at halftime.

Girls' volleyball
The program has won 9 Western Mass Championships (2007, 2008, 2009, 2010, 2011, 2012, 2013, 2015, 2021) and 6 League Championships (2007, 2008, 2009, 2010, 2011, 2012).

Boys' tennis

The Longmeadow High School boys tennis team has won 23 Western Mass titles (D-I) between 1999 to 2019.

Other sports

Longmeadow's men's ice hockey team has won two Division III State Championships, in 2006 and 2010. They have won and played in multiple Western Mass Championships, winning in '80-'81 '05, '06, '09-'10,'12 and '19. They were finalists in '99, '03, '04, '08, '11, and '17. Westfield and Longmeadow's ice hockey teams have combined for every Western Massachusetts title since 2002, with only one other school winning it in 2015. In 1980, the team went to Boston Garden for the first time, losing the Division II State Final to Barnstable in overtime.
 The girls' lacrosse team won the Division I State Championship in 2004. The girls' lacrosse team currently holds a 103-game winning streak against Western Massachusetts opponents. They were also State Finalists in 2005, 2006, 2007, 2008, 2009, 2010, 2011, 2013, and 2014.
 The girls' soccer team won the Division I Western Massachusetts Championship in 2004. They beat Cathedral in the semi-finals to earn the spot against Minnechaug, the number one team in Western Mass. They  beat Minnechaug 1–0 to claim the Western Mass Championship. Longmeadow went on to the State Semi-Finals, losing to Nashoba 1–0 in overtime.
The boys' basketball team won their first ever Western Massachusetts Division I Championship over West Springfield in 2008, under head coach Tim Allen .
The 2007 girls' volleyball team won their first ever Western Mass Division I Championship over Amherst. In 2008, they repeated, and beat East Longmeadow in the Western Mass Finals. Both teams lost in the State-Semifinals, the 2008 team to Central Catholic.
In 2004 and 2005, the golf team won back-to-back Division I State Championships.
The girls' swimming team has won multiple Western Mass titles and state titles.
The boys' swimming team has won multiple Western Mass and state titles along with many runners-up placings.
In 2013, a boys' bowling team was developed. The team went 13–4 in their first season.
In 2019 the boys' soccer team won the state title for the first time.
In 2022 the field hockey team won the state title for the first time.

Programs

Music 
Longmeadow High School's music program includes an orchestra, a student-run chamber orchestra, two bands (a concert band and an honors level Wind Ensemble), a jazz band, a pep band, four women's choirs, a men's choir, an honors choir, an a cappella women's choir, and an honors a cappella choir. These ensembles have went on international tours, giving performances at Carnegie Hall and Boston Symphony Hall, and have received MICCA Festival Gold Medals. In the 50s and 60s, Longmeadow High School did musical productions such as Oklahoma and The Mikado.

In 2014, the Longmeadow Symphony Orchestra was picked to perform at All-Eastern in Providence, Rhode Island.

Other 
In June 2010, Longmeadow High School won the championship of the WGBH TV program, High School Quiz Show, defeating The Bromfield School in the final match. The school also competed in the WGBY-TV quiz show, As Schools Match Wits, where their 2010 team reached the finals and their 2022 team won the championship.

Notable alumni 
Eric Lesser, State senator for Massachusetts
Brynn Cartelli –  Season 14 winner of NBC's The Voice
Steve Courson –  offensive guard for NFL's Pittsburgh Steelers and Tampa Bay Buccaneers, 2-time Super Bowl champion
John DeLuca – actor; played Butchy in Teen Beach Movie
Meghann Fahy – actress on Broadway and television; singer;  known for her role as Natalie Goodman in Next to Normal on Broadway
Jay Heaps – former soccer player and former coach of the New England Revolution from 2011 to 2017.
Andrea Leers – Class of 1960; Principal of Leers-Weinzapfel Associates, recipient of 2007 American Institute of Architects Firm Award
Aaron Lewis – lead singer of the alternative metal band Staind
Bridget Moynahan – actress, star of films such as John Wick, I, Robot and The Recruit and TV series Blue Bloods
Alicia Ouellette – President and dean of Albany Law School
Joe Philbin – assistant head coach of NFL's Indianapolis Colts, former head coach of Miami Dolphins
Joey Santiago – lead guitarist of The Pixies

References

External links

 Longmeadow High School website
 MCAS Data for Longmeadow High School
 Western Massachusetts Football website
 Longmeadow High School Music website
The Jet Jotter

Educational institutions established in 1955
Schools in Hampden County, Massachusetts
Public high schools in Massachusetts
1955 establishments in Massachusetts